Agent Side Grinder is a Swedish electronic band from Bromma, Stockholm, which was formed in 2005. The band has made four albums and toured extensively throughout Europe.

Their first two albums, Agent Side Grinder (2008) and Irish Recording Tape (2009) were rooted in post-punk, industrial and dark electro.

Their third album Hardware (2012) showed a bigger and more textured sound. It was named "album of the month" in Vice Magazine, topped several annual "best of-lists" including Dagens Nyheter, Metro and Time Out Paris and won the Manifest-award (Swedish indie-grammy) for best synth album in 2013. also on the album were Swedish musicians Skriet and Henric de la Cour.

In 2015 they released Alkimia, a dramatic and melodic album that exceeded the success of "Hardware" (another Manifest win). The album contains a guest appearance by Nicole Sabouné.

After Kristoffer Grip, Henrik Sunbring and Thobias Eidevald decided to leave the band in 2017, Johan Lange and Peter Fristedt together with new singer Emanuel Åström returned in 2019 with their comeback album A/X.

Agent Side Grinder has done seven European tours and played festivals such as M'era Luna Festival, Wave-Gotik-Treffen, The Great Escape, Eurosonic, Les Transmusicales de Rennes, Entremurahlas, Bimfest, Drop Dead Festival and Arvikafestivalen. They have opened for bands such as Suicide and Laibach and collaborated with artists like Dirk Ivens, Kite and Henric de la Cour.

Members 
Current members
 Johan Lange – synthesizer, keyboard, programming, percussion, backing vocals
 Peter Fristedt – modular synthesizer, tape loops
 Emanuel Åström – vocals

Former members
 Alexander Blomqvist – bass guitar (2007–2011)
 Henrik Sunbring – synthesizer (2007–2017)
 Kristoffer Grip – vocals 
 Thobias Eidevald – bass guitar (2011–2017)

Discography

References

External links 
 Official website

Swedish rock music groups
Musical groups established in 2005